Days Gone By is the third studio album by American country music artist James House, released in 1995. It was also his only album for the Epic Records label.

The album itself peaked at 48 on the U.S. Billboard Top Country Albums charts, and 19 on Top Heatseekers. Four of its singles entered the Billboard Hot Country Singles & Tracks (now Hot Country Songs) charts: "A Real Good Way to Wind Up Lonesome", "Little by Little", "This Is Me Missing You", and "Anything for Love"; "This Is Me Missing You" was the highest-charting single of his career, peaking at No. 6 in mid-1995. In addition, the album's title track was included in the soundtrack to the 1994 movie The Cowboy Way.

Days Gone By also features guest vocals from Trisha Yearwood, as well as Raul Malo (of The Mavericks) and Nikki Nelson (who was then the lead singer for Highway 101).

Track listing

Personnel

The House Band
John Bohlinger – electric guitar
Jeanie Cioff – fiddle, background vocals
Steve Cox – keyboards
Craig Flynn – bass guitar, background vocals
James House – lead vocals, background vocals, acoustic guitar
Kenneth Smith – drums

Additional musicians
Bruce Bouton – pedal steel guitar, slide guitar
Dennis Burnside – piano, Hammond organ
Mark Casstevens – acoustic guitar, mandolin
Rob Hajacos – fiddle, "electric hoedown tools"
David Hungate – bass guitar
John Barlow Jarvis – piano, Hammond organ
Raul Malo – background vocals on "Take Me Away"
Brent Mason – electric guitar
Nikki Nelson – background vocals on "Only a Fool"
John Wesley Ryles – background vocals
John Willis – 12-string guitar, baritone guitar, electric guitar
Dennis Wilson – background vocals
Lonnie Wilson – drums, percussion
Glenn Worf – bass guitar, upright bass
Trisha Yearwood – background vocals on "Anything for Love"

Strings on "Until You Set Me Free" and "That's Something (You Don't See Every Day)" performed by the Nashville String Machine and arranged by Dennis Burnside.

Chart performance

References
[ Days Gone By] at Allmusic

1995 albums
Epic Records albums
James House (singer) albums
Albums produced by Don Cook